Campeonato Nacional de Juniores C/Iniciados is the top level of the Portuguese football league system for youth players 15-year-old and under. It is administrated by the Portuguese Football Federation. The league started in 1974 and has been historically dominated by the Big Three clubs.

Winners

Performance by club

Notes

References

Football leagues in Portugal
Recurring sporting events established in 1974
1974 establishments in Portugal